A wing is a ballroom dance move, in the silver syllabus of competition waltz.  It is a transitional movement that repositions the follower to the leader's left side.  Thus, while many dance moves can precede a wing, only a reverse movement can follow a wing, such as a reverse turn, double reverse spin, Telemark, fallaway reverse, or drag hesitation.

The wing begins with a forward hesitation while leading the woman to take three forward steps to the man's left side.  Thus, the next figure will begin in outside partner position, moving into a reverse turn.

Footwork

The wing may be preceded by any type of whisk, a chassé from promenade position, an open Telemark, or an open impetus.

Leader (man)

Follower (lady)

Closed wing

The closed wing is a Gold syllabus step.  Whereas the regular wing ends in an outside partner position, the closed wing ends in closed position. The closed wing may be preceded by a chassé from promenade position or an outside change.  It may be followed by a reverse turn or several variations of the whisk.

Leader (man)

Follower (lady)

References

External links
  demonstrated by Isaia Berardi and Cinzia Birarelli

Waltz dance moves